Bhadradri may refer to:

 Bhadrachalam or Bhadradri, a census town in Telangana
 Bhadradri Kothagudem district, a district in Telangana
 Bhadradri Ramudu,  a 2004 Indian film
 Bhadradri Ramadasu or Bhadrachala Ramadasu, a 17th-century Indian composer
 Bhadradri Thermal Power Plant, a proposed power plant project

See also
 Sita Ramachandraswamy Temple, Bhadrachalam